Sailors' Snug Harbor, also known as Sailors Snug Harbor and informally as Snug Harbor, is a collection of architecturally significant 19th-century buildings on Staten Island, New York City. The buildings are set in an  park along the Kill Van Kull in New Brighton, on the North Shore of Staten Island.  Some of the buildings and the grounds are used by arts organizations under the umbrella of the Snug Harbor Cultural Center and Botanical Garden.

Sailors' Snug Harbor was founded as a retirement home for sailors after Captain Robert Richard Randall bequeathed funds for that purpose upon his 1801 death. Snug Harbor opened in 1833 as a sailors' retirement home located within what is now Building C, and additional structures were built on the grounds in later years. The buildings became a cultural center after the sailors' home moved away in 1976. The grounds and buildings are operated by Snug Harbor Cultural Center and Botanical Garden, a nonprofit, Smithsonian-affiliated organization.

Sailors' Snug Harbor includes 26 Greek Revival, Beaux Arts, Italianate and Victorian style buildings. Among those are "Temple Row", five interlocking Greek Revival buildings labeled A through E. The buildings are set in extensive, landscaped grounds, surrounded by the 19th-century cast-iron fence. The grounds also include a chapel and a sailors' cemetery. The cultural center includes the Staten Island Botanical Garden, the Staten Island Children's Museum, the Staten Island Museum, the Newhouse Center for Contemporary Art, and the Noble Maritime Collection, as well as the Art Lab and the Music Hall.

The site is considered Staten Island's "crown jewel" and "an incomparable remnant of New York's 19th-century seafaring past." It is a National Historic Landmark District. Several buildings in the complex are New York City designated landmarks.

History

Creation 

Snug Harbor was founded through a bequest after the 1801 death of Revolutionary War soldier and ship master Captain Robert Richard Randall, namesake of the nearby neighborhood of Randall Manor.  In his will, Randall left his country estate in Manhattan, bounded by Fifth Avenue, Broadway, 10th Street, and the southern side of 8th Street in present-day Greenwich Village, to build an institution to care for "aged, decrepit and worn-out" seamen.

The first meeting of the corporation of Sailors’ Snug Harbor took place in 1806. In its first election, then Mayor DeWitt Clinton was elected president. Several challenges to Randall's will took place; one by a Stephen Brown who alleged that Randall failed as executor of the estate of his grandfather in New Jersey from which the Randall estate was derived, and one from Anglican Bishop John Inglis of Nova Scotia who alleged he was a proper collateral heir through his common ancestor John Crooke. The corporation was ironically legally represented by Thomas Addis Emmet, a former member of the Society of United Irishmen, an organization inspired by the success of the American Revolution to fight the British in Ireland. Future President Martin Van Buren also served on the defense team, and Daniel Webster provided counsel to the plaintiffs.

By the time the will challenge was settled, the once-rural land around the Manhattan estate had become well-developed.  Snug Harbor's trustees (appointed by Randall's will, they included the mayor of New York City, the president and vice president of the Marine Society, senior ministers of the Episcopal and Presbyterian Churches, the head of the Chamber of Commerce, and the chancellor of the State) decided to maximize the profits on the Manhattan property.  They changed the proposed site of the institution to another piece of land bequeathed by Randall: a 130-acre plot on Staten Island overlooking the Kill Van Kull. The land was purchased in May 1831.

Sailors' home 

The institution began with a single building, now the centerpiece in the row of five Greek Revival temple-like buildings on the New Brighton waterfront. The first building, now building C, was the first known work to be designed by Minard Lafever and completed in August 1833. When Sailors' Snug Harbor opened with the completion of building C, it became the country's first home for retired merchant seamen. The residents were referred to as "inmates" in the parlance of the day. 

From 1867 to 1884, Captain Thomas Melville, a retired sea captain and brother of Moby-Dick author Herman Melville, was governor of Snug Harbor. In 1890, Captain Gustavus Trask, the governor of Snug Harbor, built a Renaissance Revival church, the Randall Memorial Chapel and, next to it, a music hall, both designed by Robert W. Gibson. At its peak in the late 19th century, about 1,000 retired sailors lived at Snug Harbor, then one of the wealthiest charities in New York.  Its Washington Square area properties yielded a surplus exceeding the retirement home's costs by $100,000 a year.

By the mid-20th century, however, Snug Harbor was in financial difficulty.  Once-grand structures fell into disrepair, and some were demolished; the ornate white-marble Randall Memorial Church was torn down in 1952. With the arrival of the Social Security system in the 1930s, demand for accommodation for old sailors declined; by the mid-1950s, fewer than 200 residents remained.

Landmark designations and sale 
In the 1960s, the institution's trustees proposed to redevelop the site with high-rise buildings; the then-new New York City Landmarks Preservation Commission stepped forward to save the remaining buildings, designating them landmark structures. A series of legal battles ensued, but the validity of landmark designation was ultimately upheld in 1968. The buildings were added to the National Register of Historic Places in 1972, and the grounds was declared a National Historic Landmark district in 1976. 

The trustees sold the Staten Island site to the New York City government in two separate transactions in 1972 and 1974, totaling $9.7 million. However, the city incurred a budget deficit as a result of the 1975 New York City fiscal crisis, leaving the government unable to perform even minor maintenance. The trustees had also been losing about $300,000 a year from the Staten Island site, and they found that it was unprofitable to keep operating the Staten Island facility. In June 1976, the trustees moved the institution to Sea Level, North Carolina. Two sailors on the Staten Island property held out until September 1976.

The Trustees of the Sailors' Snug Harbor in the City of New York continues to use funds from the endowment to help mariners all over the country. The Sailors' Snug Harbor Archives are preserved at the Stephen B. Luce Library at the State University of New York's Maritime College in the Bronx.

Cultural center 
The Snug Harbor Cultural Center and the Staten Island Botanical Garden were established in 1975. The former would operate the buildings, while the latter would maintain the gardens on the grounds. On September 12, 1976, the Snug Harbor Cultural Center was opened to the public.

In 2008, the Cultural Center and the Staten Island Botanical Garden merged to become the Snug Harbor Cultural Center and Botanical Garden.

Architecture 

The five interlocking Greek Revival buildings at Snug Harbor are located on the northern end of the grounds, near Richmond Terrace, and are known as buildings A through E from west to east. The five buildings were designed by Minard Lafever and Richard Smyth, and constructed from 1831 to 1880. Building C was an administration building while the remaining structures were dormitories. The buildings are parallel to each other, but due to the differing facade designs, buildings B and D appear to be set back from buildings A, C, and E. They were regarded in one book as "the most ambitious moment of the classic revival in the United States" and the "most extraordinary" suite of Greek temple-style buildings in the United States. 

Another set of buildings, labeled F through H, are respectively located south of buildings D through B, and are connected to each other and to the buildings immediately north of them. The Great Hall and Music Hall are located east of buildings H through F. South of the Music Hall is the Veteran’s Memorial Hall, formerly known as the chapel. A matron's house and a maintenance building are south of buildings H through F and east of the chapel. The Staten Island Children's Museum and World Trade Center Educational Tribute are in the center of the grounds, south of the maintenance building and matron's house, while the Snug Harbor Administration building is south of the museum. On the west end of the site are five cottages labeled A through E.

Buildings A through E are individually listed as landmarks, as are the 131-year-old chapel and the interiors of building C and the chapel. The five main buildings and chapel were made landmarks in 1965; and the building C and chapel interiors in 1982.

Buildings A through E

Building A
Building A was designed by Richard Smyth and constructed in 1879. The building consists of two stories as well as a raised basement and an attic, and it is rectangular in plan with a gable roof. The main entrance contains a set of steps underneath a stone portico, consisting of six columns supporting a classic pediment. The structure was initially intended as a dormitory building. Building A has housed the Staten Island Museum since 2015.

Building B
Building B was designed by Minard Lafever and constructed from 1839 to 1840. It is two stories high with an attic and a high basement, and it is rectangular in plan with a gable roof. The front facade is made of smooth stone and contains a small porch with a gable. The structure was initially intended as a dormitory building. Building B is not open to the public , although the Staten Island Museum plans to expand there by 2022.

Building C

Building C, also known as the Administration Building, is a Greek Revival building designed by Minard Lafever and constructed from 1831 to 1883; it is Lafever's oldest surviving work. The building consists of two stories as well as a raised basement and an attic, and it is rectangular in plan with a gable roof. The main entrance contains a set of steps underneath a stone portico, consisting of eight columns supporting a classic pediment. The sides of building C are eight bays wide, while the rear elevation is made of brick. Single-story passageways extend east to building D, west to building B, and south to an annex.

Building C was originally an administrative building, though it also included bedrooms, kitchens, dining rooms, washrooms, and recreational rooms. The portico entrance leads to a main hall that is  stories high, with a vaulted ceiling containing a dome in the center, as well as ash floors. Nine doorways lead from the main hall to other rooms on the first floor, while the three passageways to the other buildings are at the center of the eastern, western, and southern walls. A staircase on the left (east) side of the main hall, with iron railings and wooden wainscoted walls, connects the first and second floors. The second floor consists of a balcony surrounding the main hall with a cast-iron railing. There are fourteen doorways leading off the second floor balcony. The vaulted ceiling rises from brackets at all four corners of the main hall. Various maritime-themed decorative elements and carvings are located on the ceiling and walls, and there are two clerestory windows on the north and south walls resembling the sun and moon. 

Building C's interior was renovated in 1884. The rotunda was again restored in the 1990s. Building C houses part of the Newhouse Center for Contemporary Art.

Building D
Building D was designed by Minard Lafever and constructed from 1831 to 1841. It is two stories high with an attic and a high basement, and it is rectangular in plan with a gable roof. The front facade is made of smooth stone and contains a small porch with a gable. The structure was initially intended as a dormitory building. Building D has housed the Noble Maritime Collection since 1992.

Building E
Building E was designed by Richard Smyth and constructed in 1880. The building consists of two stories as well as a raised basement and an attic, and it is rectangular in plan with a gable roof. The main entrance contains a set of steps underneath a stone portico, consisting of six columns supporting a classic pediment. The structure was initially intended as a dormitory building. Building E is not open to the public .

Veteran's Memorial Hall 

The Veteran's Memorial Hall, formerly the chapel, was designed by local builder James Solomon and constructed between 1855 and 1856. Stylistically, it was a "transitional" building, with stylistic elements mainly rooted in Italianate architecture as well as some elements of Greek Revival architecture. The design of the chapel is based on that of a typical New England church. The chapel contains a gable roof. The front entrance consists of a tower with a belfry projecting from the front end of the chapel. The entrance leads to a plaster-walled vestibule with three round arches and three plaques. The brick facade has six round-arched windows on each side, separated by pilasters. At the rear is a one-story extension with an office and sacristy. The chapel has stained glass windows inside.

Inside is a rectangular space that could fit 600 people. The space also contains wooden pews and wainscoted walls. The coved ceiling has a recessed panel with two lamps. A gallery on the north end is supported by two cast-iron columns and has recessed wood paneling. An apse at the south end surrounds a raised former altar area. At the center of an apse is a doorway to the office, which has plastered walls with bookcases built into them, as well as a stone fireplace.

When built, the main entrance was through a central round arch at the front, which was topped by a pediment surrounded by Doric pilasters. A round-arched window and lintel flanked either side of the main entrance, while a full height pilaster was located at each corner. One observer in 1873 said that the chapel was a "plain but handsome brick building, without any cupola or belfry." The walls were repainted that year, with decorative elements resembling panels and pilasters. The chapel's bell tower and stained glass date to 1883. The chapel was relocated  from its previous site in 1893. The Veteran's Memorial Hall was damaged in 2014, and the building is not open to the public .

Grounds

The buildings are set in extensive, landscaped grounds. There are five gates, two of which are vehicular gates, and the other three of which are used by pedestrians only. The vehicular gates are the west gate on Snug Harbor Road and the east gate on Tysen Street. The others are the north gate on Richmond Terrace, the south gate on Henderson Avenue, and the Kissel gate on Kissel Avenue at the far western end of the property. The Italianate gate house at the north gate, as well as the mid-19th-century iron fence on Richmond Terrace, are New York City designated landmarks.

Paul Goldberger wrote, "Snug Harbor has something of the feel of a campus, something of the feel of a small-town square. Indeed, these rows of classical temples, set side-by-side with tiny connecting structures recessed behind the grand facades, are initially perplexing because they fit into no pattern we recognize — they are lined up as if on a street, yet they are set in the landscape of a park. They seem at once to embrace the 19th-century tradition of picturesque design and, by virtue of their rigid linear order, to reject it."

The grounds include a 1893 zinc fountain featuring the god Neptune, now indoors with a replica in its place. The New York Times described the statue as sitting "in the middle, astride a shell held aloft by sea monsters, his trident raised. Jets of water spurt from the fountain's center and from bouquets of metal calla lilies to its sides." Also on the grounds is a bronze statue of Robert Randall by Augustus Saint-Gaudens.

Iron fence and gatehouses 

An iron railing surrounds the property. About  of the fence on the northern edge of the property, built in the mid-19th century in the Greek Revival style, is designated as a city landmark. Several gates flanked by granite posts were embedded in the fence.

The grounds are accessed by numerous gatehouses that date to the period between 1851 and 1875. They are designed in the Italianate, Second Empire, and Romanesque styles. The main vehicular entrance is the western gatehouse, which dates from 1880.

The northern gatehouse on Richmond Terrace is directly in front of building C and set back  behind the iron fence. It is trapezoidal in plan and has a high archway in the center. Guard rooms with rectangular windows flank either side of the archway. Unused marble and sandstone from the construction of the original structures was used to create the quoins surrounding the archway and window openings. The top of the gatehouse has brick corbels supporting a cornice. A square cupola is at the center of the archway.

Snug Harbor Cemetery

The residents of Sailors' Snug Harbor were buried on the grounds in what was called "Monkey Hill". The location of the cemetery is across the road from the current Snug Harbor complex in Allison Pond Park, which used to be part of the original Snug Harbor campus. The pond served as a water supply for the Snug Harbor facility until 1939. The cemetery portion (surrounded by a red brick wall) is still owned by the Snug Harbor Center, while the remaining land was sold in 1975 to the city and turned into a public park with hiking trails. The majority of the over 7,000 bodies (including those of military sailors) now lay in unmarked graves because their headstones were removed in the 1980s and put into storage for preservation after the cemetery became inactive.

Snug Harbor Cultural Center and Botanical Garden
Snug Harbor Cultural Center and Botanical Garden is a nonprofit, Smithsonian-affiliated organization that operates Sailors' Snug Harbor.  Its primary purpose is "to operate, manage and develop the premises known as Sailors Snug Harbor as a cultural and educational center and park." In 2005, it was among 406 New York City arts and social service institutions to receive part of a $20 million grant from the Carnegie Corporation, which was made possible through a donation by former Mayor of New York City Michael Bloomberg. In 2006, the revenues and expenses of the nonprofit were both around US$3.7 million, and its year-end assets were $2.6 million.  It is home to the Staten Island Children's Theater Association (SICTA) and the Staten Island Conservatory of Music.

Staten Island Botanical Garden
The Staten Island Botanical Garden maintains extensive gardens. The White Garden was inspired by Vita Sackville-West's famous garden at Sissinghurst. Connie Gretz's Secret Garden was dedicated in 2000 with funding from local resident Randy Gretz, in honor of his late wife; it contains a castle, a maze and walled secret garden. The New York Chinese Scholar's Garden, an authentic, walled, Chinese garden, was built in 1998 in the style of the famous gardens of Suzhou.

Newhouse Center for Contemporary Art
Established in 1977, the Newhouse Center for Contemporary Art exhibits the works of local and international artists. It was founded inside the architecturally significant Greek Revival buildings of Sailors‘ Snug Harbor.

Although the Newhouse was founded with a focus on artists who live or have their studios on Staten Island and art that reflects the history of Staten Island or Snug Harbor,  the Newhouse moved on to a broader focus on contemporary art. Unlike many New York museums, the Newhouse has the space to mount large shows and large works, and can add outdoor sculpture to the mix.

Noble Maritime Collection
The Noble Maritime Collection is a museum in building D, with a particular emphasis on the work of artist/lithographer/sailor John A. Noble (1913–1983). It opened in 2000 after seven years of planning.

The Washington Post called the exhibit of a houseboat that Noble converted into an artist's studio "compelling... It is a home on the water and an artist's lair all in one, complete with wooden surfaces, portholes, an engineer's bed, a drawing table, and printmaking and etching implements." The New York Sun called the Noble Collection "an unsung gem among New York museums."

Staten Island Children's Museum

The Staten Island Children's Museum features a rotating collection of hands-on exhibits and an extensive year round live animal collection of exotic arthropods. The Children's Museum consists of the main building which was originally built in 1913 and the old Snug Harbor barn where the livestock was originally kept to feed the residents of Sailors’ Snug Harbor. When the museum was developed, a modern walkway was built connecting the two structures to create one museum building.

Staten Island Museum

The Staten Island Museum opened a location at Snug Harbor in September 2015. After operating two locations for almost two years, the museum closed the St. George location and consolidated its operations in building A. The Museum hopes to expand to building B by 2022.

Art Lab 
Art Lab is a school of fine and applied art, founded in 1975 and offering art instruction and exhibitions.

Music Hall

A 686-seat Greek Revival auditorium, the Music Hall hosts performing arts. It is the second-oldest music hall in New York City, having opened in July 1892 with a performance of a cantata, "The Rose Maiden." In attendance were some 600 residents of the home who sat on plain wooden seats, and 300 trustees and their guests who occupied the venue's upholstered balcony seats.

Transportation
The  bus travels to and from the Staten Island Ferry and Staten Island Railway at St. George Terminal, stopping at Snug Harbor's front gate. Additionally, the Sailors' Snug Harbor station was served by the Staten Island Railway's now-defunct North Shore Branch. Although the station closed in 1953, a retaining wall and stairways from the station still exist.

In popular culture

In an 1898 article in Ainslee's Magazine, "When The Sails Are Furled: Sailor's Snug Harbor," the soon-to-be-famous novelist Theodore Dreiser provided an amusing non-fiction account of the obstreperous and frequently intoxicated residents of Snug Harbor.

The American maritime folk song collector William Main Doerflinger collected a number of songs from residents at Sailors’ Snug Harbor which were among those published in his 1951 compilation, "Shantymen and Shantyboys", reprinted in 1972 as "Songs of the Sailorman and Lumberman".

In 2004, local performing arts company Sundog Theatre commissioned an original play by Damon DiMarco and Jeffrey Harper about the sailors' life at Snug Harbor. My Mariners was performed at the Harbor's Veteran's Memorial Hall.

The 2009 illustrated novel Peter Pigeon of Snug Harbor, by Ed Weiss, is set almost entirely at Snug Harbor – from its days as an old sailors' home to its new incarnation as an arts center.

Sailors' Snug Harbor was featured in Ghost Hunters, where  TAPS was asked to investigate the paranormal claims there.

In January 2013, an episode of Ghost Adventures was filmed at and focused on Sailors’ Snug Harbor and the spirits haunting the area.

See also
Greenwich Hospital, London, home for retired sailors

References
Notes

Further reading

 Barnett Shepherd, Sailors' Snug Harbor: 1801–1976, Snug Harbor, 1979.
 Gerald J. Barry, The Sailors' Snug Harbor, A History, 1801–2001, Fordham Press, 2000.
 Frances Morrone, A Home for Ancient Mariners , June 28, 2007, New York Sun

External links 

The Trustees of the Sailors' Snug Harbor in the City of New York 
Snug Harbor Cultural Center 
Noble Maritime Collection 
Staten Island Children's Museum 
Staten Island Museum 
Sailors' Snug Harbor Archives at SUNY Maritime College 
Art Lab 
Photos of Snug Harbor
Digital Culture of Metropolitan New York, Sailors' Snug Harbor Inmates Collection 
Digital Culture of Metropolitan New York, Sailors' Snug Harbor Archives Collection 

HABS

 
1833 establishments in New York (state)
Art museums and galleries in New York City
Botanical gardens in New York City
Buildings and structures on the National Register of Historic Places in New York City
Environmental organizations based in New York City
Greek Revival architecture in New York City
Historic American Buildings Survey in New York City
Historic districts in Staten Island
Museums in Staten Island
National Historic Landmarks in New York City
National Register of Historic Places in Staten Island
New York (state) in the American Revolution
New York City Designated Landmarks in Staten Island
New York City interior landmarks
Nursing homes in the United States
Parks in Staten Island
Old soldiers' homes in the United States